Hellenic historiography (or Greek historiography) involves efforts made by Greeks to track and record historical events. By the 5th century BC, it became an integral part of ancient Greek literature and held a prestigious place in later Roman historiography and Byzantine literature.

Overview
The historical period of ancient Greece is exclusive in world history as the first period attested directly in proper historiography, while earlier ancient history or proto-history is known by much more circumstantial evidence, such as annals, chronicles, king lists, and pragmatic epigraphy.

Herodotus is widely known as the "father of history," his Histories being eponymous of the entire field. Written between the 450s and 420s BC, the scope of Herodotus' work reaches about a century in the past, discussing 6th century BC historical figures such as Darius I of Persia, Cambyses II, and Psamtik III and alludes to some 8th century BC ones such as Candaules.

Herodotus was succeeded by authors such as Thucydides, Xenophon, Demosthenes, Plato and Aristotle. Most of these authors were either Athenians or pro-Athenians, which explains why far more is known about the history and politics of Athens than of most other contemporary cities. Their scope is further limited by a focus on political, military and diplomatic history, generally ignoring economic and social history. However, while works approaching modern ethnography arose primarily amongst the Romans, some Greeks did include ancillary material describing the customs and rituals of different peoples, Herodotus himself being a prime example in his descriptions of the Egyptians, Scythians and others.

See also

Chinese historiography
List of Graeco-Roman geographers
List of Greek historiographers
List of historians
Modern Greek literature
Roman historiography

References

Further reading